Panch Prayag (Pañcha prayāga) is an expression in Hindu religious ethos, specifically used to connote the five sacred river confluences in the Garhwal Himalayas in the state of Uttarakhand, India. The five prayags - prayag meaning "place of confluence of rivers" in Sanskrit - also termed as "Prayag pentad" are Vishnuprayag, Nandaprayag, Karnaprayag, Rudraprayag and Devprayag, in the descending flow sequence of their occurrence.

Path
It starts with the Vishnu Prayag on the Alaknanda River, which is one of the two source streams of the river Ganga in the Garhwal Himalayas; the other streams are the Dhauliganga, Nandakini, Pindar, Mandakini and the Bhagirathi - the head stream of the Ganges.

It flows down south towards Rishikesh and Haridwar, two holy places on the bank of the Ganges in Uttarakhand.

At each of the confluences, with large influx of pilgrims who visit the state for the pilgrimage of the Panch Kedar and Sapta Badri temples, large religious towns have developed. Pilgrims take a dip in the river at these locations before embarking on visiting the holy shrines in the "Deva Bhumi" (god's land) as Uttarakhand is commonly known. Some pilgrims do ablution at all the five prayags before worshiping Vishnu at Badrinath.

Meaning
Prayag in Hindu tradition signifies confluence of two or more rivers where ablutions (bathing) before worship, religious rites called the Shraddha (the last rites)  for the departed and worship of the river itself as manifestation of God are a prevalent practice. While the Prayag at Allahabad, where the three rivers namely, the Ganges, the Yamuna and the Saraswati confluence, is considered the holiest, the Panch Prayag of Garhwal Himalayas are the next in the order of piety. The Prayags are rich not only with stories from puranas and legend but also in scenic beauty of the Himalayan snow-covered peaks and enchanting valleys. It is also deduced that the Panch Prayag located on the road to Badrinath refer to the Swargarohana (ascend to heaven) route followed by the Pandavas to attain salvation after they completed circumambulation of the earth.

Description of the five Prayag
People of Garhwal, in particular, gather at the five prayags during Makara Sankranthi, Uttarayan, Basant Panchami and Ram Navami festivals for a holy dip in the sacred river confluences.

Vishnuprayag

The Alaknanda River, which originates from Satopanth glacier is joined by the Dhauli Ganga River near Joshimath (on Joshimath - Badrinath route). Alaknanda flows in front of the Badrinath temple, one of the most revered Hindu shrines. Legend narrates the worship offered by sage Narada to god Vishnu at this confluence. An octagonal shaped temple - located near the confluence - dated to 1889, is credited to Maharani of Indore - Ahalyabai. It houses a Vishnu image. A stairway from this temple leads to the Vishnu kund (kund means pool of water or lake) at the confluence, which is seen in a tranquil state.

Nandaprayag

Nand Prayag  is the second prayag in the cascade sequence of the confluences where the Nandakini River joins the main Alaknanda River. According to one tale, a noble King Nanda performed Yagnya (fire-sacrifice) and sought blessings of God. Hence, the confluence is named after him. The other version of the legend states that the confluence derives its name from the Yadava king Nanda, the foster-father of god Krishna. According to the legend, Vishnu granted a boon of the birth of a son to Nanda and his wife Yashoda and also the same boon to Devaki, wife of Vasudeva. Placed in a dilemma, since both were his disciples, he ensured that Krishna, an incarnation of Vishnu, was born to Devaki and Vasudeva but was fostered by Yashoda and Nanda. There is temple for Gopal, a form of Krishna, here. The legends also narrate that sage Kanva did penance here and also that wedding of  King Dushyanta and Shakuntala took place at this venue.

Karnaprayag

Karn Prayag  is the location where Alaknanda River is joined by the Pindar River that originates from the Pindar glacier, below the Nanda Devi Mountain range. The epic Mahabharata legend narrates that Karna did penance here and earned the protective gear of Kavacha (armour) and Kundala (ear rings) from his father, the Sun god, which gave him indestructible powers. The name of the confluence is thus derived from the name of Karna. There is reference to this site in Meghaduta, a Sanskrit lyrical poetic drama written by the legendary poet Kalidasa, which attributes that Satopanth and Bhagirath glaciers joined here to form the Pindar River. Another classic work by the same author called the Abhijnana-shakuntala also mentions that Shakuntala and king Dushyanta's romantic dalliance occurred here. More recently, Swami Vivekananda has also been said to have meditated here for eighteen days.

Next to the confluence site there is a large pasturage on the bank where cows are seen grazing. According to a local legend, a local zamindar (landlord) inadvertently killed a cow (go-hatya) in this pasture land, which according to Hindu religion was considered a religious offence. The contrived zamindar, who did not have adequate money to do reparatory acts to atone for this sin, requested a visiting pilgrim from South India to help him out. With the help of the philanthropic pilgrim, the zamindar bought the pasture land, dedicated it to Lord Badrinath, a form of Vishnu, with the vow that the land so acquired would be used only for the purpose of grazing by cows.

The stone seat where Karna did penance is also seen here. A temple built in recent times to commemorate Karna has the deity of goddess Uma Devi (daughter of the Himalayas) here. The stone temple was rebuilt by guru Adi Shankaracharya. In the sanctum, the images of goddess Parvati, her consort Shiva and her elephant-headed son Ganesha are installed, next to that of Uma Devi, apart from Karna's image. A steep row of steps from the temple along a spur leads to the confluence point. And, down these steps, small shrines of Shiva and the Binayak Shila (the Ganesha stone) - that is believed to provide protection from danger -  are located. Once in 12 years, a procession of the image of Uma Devi is taken round a few villages in the sub-divisional town of Karnaprayag.

Rudraprayag

At Rudra Prayag  the Alaknanda meets the Mandakini River. The confluence is named after god Shiva, who is also known as Rudra. According to a widely narrated legend, Shiva performed the Tandava here, Tandava is a vigorous dance that is the source of the cycle of creation, preservation and dissolution. Shiva also played his favourite musical instrument the Rudra veena here. By playing the Veena, he enticed god Vishnu to his presence and converted him to water.

Another legend narrates that sage Narada had become conceited by his Veena playing skills. The gods requested Krishna in order to set things right. Krishna told Narada that Shiva and his consort Parvati were impressed by his musical talent. Narada was taken in by the praise and immediately set out to meet Shiva in the Himalayas. On the way at Rudra Prayag, he met several beautiful damsels called raginis (musical notes) who were disfigured and the reason for such disfigurement was squarely attributed to Narada playing his Veena. Hearing this, Narada felt humbled and surrendered before Shiva and decided to devote himself to learning music as disciple of Shiva.

According to another legend, the consort of Shiva - Sati was reborn as Parvati as the daughter of Himalaya, after she self-immolated herself in protest of the insult of Shiva. In spite of Himalaya's protests, Parvati performed rigorous penance to get the boon of becoming Shiva's wife in the new birth too.

Temples dedicated to Rudranath (Shiva) and goddess Chamunda are located here.

Devprayag

Dev Prayag  is the confluence of the two holy rivers, the Bhagirathi - the chief stream of the Ganges and the Alaknanda. It is the first prayag on the way to Badrinath. Beyond this confluence, the river is known as Ganges. The holiness of this place is considered equal to the famous Triveni sangam confluence at Allahabad where the Ganges, Yamuna and Saraswati rivers merge.

The confluence of the Bhagirathi, which flows in rapids with strong currents meets a much calmer river in the Alaknanda and this has been vividly described by the British captain Raper as:
The contrast between the two rivers joining here is striking. The Bhaghirathi runs down a steep declivity with rapid force, roaring and foaming flowing over large fragments placed in its bed, while the placid, Alakananda, flowing, with a smooth, unruffled surface, gently winds round the point till,  meeting with her turbulent consort, she is forcibly hurried down, and unites her clamours with the blustering current.

The confluence got the name tag 'Dev' from  a poor Brahmin called Deva Sharma who performed "rigorous religious austerities" here and was blessed by Rama, Vishnu's incarnation and hero of the epic Ramayana. There are two Kunds or ponds on the banks of the rivers which join here, these are: the Vasistha Kund on the Bhagirathi and the Brahma Kund on the bank of the Alakananda. Legend also mentions about this site being Vishnu's navel and that Brahma meditated here.

The many legendary kings who did penance here were, Rama - to atone for his sin of killing the demon-king Ravana, a Brahmin. Legend also states that Vishnu entreated the demon-king Bali for 3 steps of land here. Legend also states that Rama, before attaining salvation, vanished from here. Vaishnavites consider it as one of the 108 Divya Desams (sacred abodes of Vishnu) for undertaking a pilgrimage during their lifetime.

A famous temple dedicated to Rama called the Raghunath Math is located above the confluence. It is believed to be installed in the temple about 1250 years ago. A Shiva temple is also located nearby.

Ancient stone inscriptions have also been traced here. The stone inscriptions dates the temple's existence to the first century AD. The top is surrounded by a white cupola. The sloping roof over the cupola is supported by wooden pillars. The roof is made up of copper plates adorned by plated ball with a spire. An image of Garuda (a divine bird in human form with a beak and wings to fly, which is the vahana or vehicle of Vishnu). On the festive days of Ram Navami, Vasant Panchami and Baisakhi, which are  special occasions at this temple, the god is placed on a stone shown for worship. A stairway from the temple of Deva Prayag of Panch Prayag, leads to the confluence of Bhagirathi and Alakananda rivers where a distinct demarcation of the churning muddy stream of Alakananda mix with the saffron clear flows of Bhagirathi is seen (see picture in infobox) to evolve as Ganges, the holiest river for Hindus. Brahmins and pilgrims feed the fish species Cyprinus denticulatus ( length) at this site.

Access
Access to the five confluence locations on the Rishikesh-Badrinath highway is reckoned from Rishikesh, which is the gateway to the Garhwal Himalayas. Rishikesh is a rail head that connects to all parts of the country and the nearest airport.

The distances from Rishikesh to the five prayags are:
  to Vishnu Prayag via Joshimath which is away;
  to Nanda Prayag;
  to Karna Prayag;
  to Rudra Prayag; and
  to Dev Prayag.

Appropriate time to visit the Panch Prayag
Panch Prayag lies in one of high mountains of Himalayas, with low temperatures all through the year so it's better to give them a miss during winters, when it gets very cold. All the Prayags can be reached by road throughout the year.

See also
 2013 North India floods

References

External links

A Pilgrim's report with pictures of Prayags

Related Yatras
 Panch Kedar
 Chhota Char Dham

Hindu pilgrimage sites in India
Hindu temples in Uttarakhand
Vishnu temples
Shiva temples